Qingshui Temple may refer to the following temples in Taiwan:
 Bangka Qingshui Temple in Wanhua District, Taipei
 Zhouzi Qingshui Temple in Zuoying District, Kaohsiung